Christopher Beale  has been a Justice in the Trial Division of the Supreme Court of Victoria since 2 September 2014, sitting mainly in the criminal division of that court.

Beale's career in criminal law began in 1986 when he became a duty lawyer for the Legal Aid Commission of Victoria. He joined the Victorian Bar in 1988, and in 2007 was appointed a Crown Prosecutor. He returned to the Bar in 2011, and was appointed Senior Counsel in 2012 and King's Counsel in 2013. As Supreme Court Justice, Beale was responsible for delivering the judgement in the high-profile manslaughter of Karen Ristevski.

In 2018, during the criminal proceedings of a man accused of plotting a Christmas Day terrorism attack, Beale's decision to ban the wife of the accused from the court's public gallery gained significant media coverage. Beale banned the women from seeing her husbands proceedings due to the fact that she was wearing a niqāb. Beale said "whilst all are welcome in my court, spectators in the public gallery must have their faces uncovered, chiefly for security reasons" and that "once there are multiple spectators in the public gallery wearing niqabs and traditional Islamic dress, working out who was who if something happened in court might not be a simple matter, especially as such dress tends to be very similar."

References

Judges of the Supreme Court of Victoria
Living people
Year of birth missing (living people)
Australian King's Counsel